The BMJ is a weekly peer-reviewed medical trade journal, published by the trade union the British Medical Association (BMA). The BMJ has editorial freedom from the BMA. It is one of the world's oldest general medical journals. Originally called the British Medical Journal, the title was officially shortened to BMJ in 1988, and then changed to The BMJ in 2014. The journal is published by BMJ Publishing Group Ltd, a subsidiary of the British Medical Association (BMA). The editor-in-chief of The BMJ is Kamran Abbasi, who was appointed in January 2022.

History 
The journal began publishing on 3 October 1840 as the Provincial Medical and Surgical Journal and quickly attracted the attention of physicians around the world through its publication of high-impact original research articles and unique case reports. The BMJs first editors were P. Hennis Green, lecturer on the diseases of children at the Hunterian School of Medicine, who also was its founder and Robert Streeten of Worcester, a member of the Provincial Medical and Surgical Association council.

The first issue of the Provincial Medical and Surgical Journal (PMSJ) was 16 pages long and contained three simple woodcut illustrations. The longest items were the editors' introductory editorial and a report of the Provincial Medical and Surgical Association's Eastern Branch. Other pages included a condensed version of Henry Warburton's medical reform bill, book reviews, clinical papers, and case notes. There were  columns of advertisements. Inclusive of stamp duty it cost 7d, a price which remained until 1844. In their main article, Green and Streeten noted that they had "received as many advertisements (in proportion to the quantity of letter press) for our first number, as the most popular Medical Journal, (The Lancet) after seventeen years of existence."

In their introductory editorial and later statements, Green and Streeten defined "the main objects of promotion of which the Provincial Medical and Surgical Journal is established". Summarised, there were two clear main objectives: the advancement of the profession, especially in the provinces and the dissemination of medical knowledge. Green and Streeten also expressed interest in promoting public well-being as well as maintaining 'medical practitioners, as a class in that rank of society which, by their intellectual acquirements, by their general moral character, and by the importance of the duties entrusted to them, they are justly entitled to hold'.

In April 1842 the journal was retitled the Provincial Medical Journal and Retrospect of the Medical Sciences, but two years later reverted to the PMSJ under the sole editorship of Streeten. It was then in 1857 that the BMJ first appeared when the PMSJ was merged with the Associated Medical Journal (Vols. 1 to 4;  1853 to 1856), which had itself evolved from the London Medical Journal (Vols. 1 to 4; 1849 to 1852) under the editorship of John Rose Cormack.

The BMJ published the first centrally randomised controlled trial. The journal also carried the seminal papers on the causal effects of smoking on health and lung cancer and other causes of death in relation to smoking.

For a long time, the journal's sole competitor was The Lancet, also based in the UK, but with increasing globalisation, The BMJ has faced tough competition from other medical journals, particularly The New England Journal of Medicine and the Journal of the American Medical Association.

Journal content 
The BMJ is an advocate of evidence-based medicine. It publishes research as well as clinical reviews, recent medical advances, editorial perspectives, among others.

A special "Christmas Edition" is published annually on the Friday before Christmas. This edition is known for research articles which apply a serious academic approach to investigating less serious medical questions. The results are often humorous and widely reported by the mainstream media.

The BMJ has an open peer review system, wherein authors are told who reviewed their manuscript. About half the original articles are rejected after review in-house. Manuscripts chosen for peer review are first reviewed by external experts, who comment on the importance and suitability for publication, before the final decision on a manuscript is made by the editorial ("hanging") committee. The acceptance rate is less than 7% for original research articles.

At the beginning of February 2021 The BMJ introduced a charge of £299 for publishing obituaries. This was widely criticised on social media, including by the British Medical Association, due to the large number of medical staff being killed by COVID-19. The decision was explained, but reversed, by the end of the month.

Rapid Recommendations
In response to the many problems with traditional medical guidelines, the journal introduced BMJ Rapid Recommendations, a series of trustworthy guidelines focused on the most pressing medical issues.

Rapid Responses
The BMJ publishes most e-letters to the journal on its Web site under the heading Rapid Responses, organised as a fully moderated Internet forum. Comments are screened for unacceptable content such as libel or obscenity, and contributors may not remove or edit contributions once published. As of January 2013, 88,500 rapid responses had been posted on the BMJ website.

Indexing and citations 
The BMJ is included in the major indexes PubMed, MEDLINE, EBSCO, and the Science Citation Index. The journal has long criticised the misuse of the impact factor to award grants and recruit researchers by academic institutions.

The five journals that cited The BMJ most often in 2008 were (in order of descending citation frequency) The BMJ, Cochrane Database of Systematic Reviews, The Lancet, BMC Public Health, and BMC Health Services Research. In the same year the five journals most frequently cited by articles published in The BMJ were The BMJ, The Lancet, The New England Journal of Medicine, Journal of the American Medical Association and Cochrane Database of Systematic Reviews.

Impact 
In the 2021 Journal Citation Reports, published in 2022, The BMJ's impact factor was 96.216. ranking it fourth among general medical journals. However, The BMJ in 2013 reported that it had become a signatory to the San Francisco Declaration on Research Assessment (commonly known as the Dora Agreement), which deprecates the inappropriate use of journal impact factors and urges journal publishers to  "greatly reduce the emphasis on the journal impact factor as a promotional tool, ideally by ceasing to promote the impact factor or by presenting it in the context of a variety of journal-based metrics."

Cello scrotum hoax article 
In 1974, Dr. Elaine Murphy submitted a brief case report  under her husband's name John which suggested a condition known as "cello scrotum," a fictional condition which supposedly affected male cellists. It was originally submitted as a joke in response to 'guitar nipple', a condition similar to jogger's nipple in which some forms of guitar playing causes irritation to the nipple, which Murphy and her husband believed was also a joke. The case report was published in The BMJ  and although not widely cited, it was cited on some occasions with those doing so expressing scepticism. The truth of the case was reported on back in 1991.

In 2009, 35 years after the original case report was published, Murphy wrote a letter to The BMJ revealing that the condition was a hoax.

Website and access policies 
The BMJ went fully online in 1995 and archived all its issues on the World Wide Web. In addition to the print content, the site contains supporting material for original research articles, additional news stories, and electronic letters to the editors.

From 1999, all content of The BMJ was freely available online; however, in 2006 this changed to a subscription model. Original research articles continue to be available freely, but from January 2006 all other 'added value' contents, including clinical reviews and editorials, require a subscription. The BMJ allows complete free access for visitors from economically disadvantaged countries as part of the HINARI initiative.

In October 2008 The BMJ announced that it would become an open access journal for research articles. A subscription continued to be required for access to other articles.

Editions 
The BMJ is principally an online journal, and only the website carries the full text content of every article. However, a number of print editions are produced targeting different groups of readers with selections of content, some of it abridged, and different advertising. The print editions are:
 General Practice (weekly) for general practitioners
 Clinical Research (weekly) for hospital doctors
 Academic (monthly) for institutions, researchers and medical academics

In addition, The BMJ also publishes a number of overseas/ foreign language editions: Argentine (in Spanish), Greek, Romanian, Chinese, and Middle Eastern (in English). There is also Student BMJ, an online resource for medical students and junior doctors which publishes an annual print edition each September.

Other services and information 
The BMJ offers several alerting services, free on request:
 This Week In The BMJ: Weekly table of contents email, latest research, video, blogs and editorial comment.
 Editor's choice: Kamran Abbasi introduces a selection of the latest research, medical news, comment and education each week.
 Today on bmj.com Daily alert with links to a short selection of articles published in The BMJ in the previous 24 hours.

Editors 

 P. Hennis Green and Robert Streeten (1840–1844)
 Robert Streeten (1844–1849)
 W.H. Ranking and J.H. Walsh (1849–1853)
 John Rose Cormack (1853–1855)
 Andrew Wynter  (1855–1861)
 William Orlando Markham (1861–1866)
 Ernest Hart (1866–1869)
 Jonathan Hutchinson (1869–1871)
 Ernest Hart (1871–1898)
 Sir Dawson Williams (1898–1928)
 Norman Gerald Horner (1928–1946)
 Hugh Clegg (1947–1965)
 Martin Ware (1966–1975)
 Stephen Lock (1975–1991)
 Richard Smith (1991–2004)
  Kamran Abbasi (Acting E-i-C) (2004– 2005  )
 Fiona Godlee (2005–2021)
  Kamran Abbasi (2022–   )

References

External links 

 
 BMJ at JSTOR

1840 establishments in the United Kingdom
BMJ Group academic journals
Creative Commons Attribution-licensed journals
English-language journals
General medical journals
British medical websites
Open access journals
Publications established in 1840
Weekly journals